Lydia Nabawanuka (born in Masaka in 1991) better known as Lydia Jazmine is a Ugandan female recording artist.

Background and education
She was born in Masaka in 1991. She attended Victoria Nile School for her elementary school. She then transferred to Saint Mary's School Namaliga, in Kimenyedde sub-county, Mukono District. She completed high school at one of the most prestigious secondary schools in Uganda, Cityland College Matugga, in Matugga, Wakiso District. In February 2016, she graduated from Multitech Business School in Kampala, Uganda's capital and largest city, with a Bachelor of Business Administration and Management degree.

Career
Jazmine started singing in high school, after she joined the school choir. Later she joined the church choir at the Passover Harvest Centre and at Watoto Church. When she graduated from high school, she joined a band called Gertnum, where she sang background vocals.

Later, the music group Radio and Weasel signed Jazmine to a contract as a back-up singer. She is the back-up vocalist on the songs "Ntunga" and "Breath Away". She later performed background vocal lyrics for Bebe Cool and Sheebah Karungi. Her first single was a duet with Rabadaba called "You Know", released circa 2014.

Partial discography
 You Know
 Nkubanja
 Cherie
 Tukumbe
 Guno Omukwano
 Meu Marido
 Same Way: duet with Geosteady
 Omuntu: duet with Sheebah Karungi
 Control: duet with Spilla
 Silent Night: duet with Kiss Daniel
 Ndaga
 Mwagala Biriyo
 Waiting for Your Love: with Liloca at Coke Studio Africa 2017
 Drum
You and Me
Mega
This must be love
Kampala kyekyo
Sing for me
Binji binji
Oja kunzita
Tonkozesa
Ebintu byange
Wankolera 
Nkubanja
Masuka
Kapeesa
I love you bae
Olindaki
Omalawo

Other work
In 2017, Jazmine was selected to participate in "Coke Studio Africa 2017", to represent Uganda, for the second consecutive year. This time she was paired with Mozambican songstress Liloca, and assigned to South African music producer Sketchy Bongo. This annual event, sponsored by Coca-Cola, is a non-competitive music show that brings together diverse musicians on the Continent, to work collaboratively with experienced local and intentional musicians and music producers.

References

External links
Lydia Jazmine videos at Youtube.com

1991 births
Ganda people
Living people
Ugandan songwriters
21st-century Ugandan women singers
People from Mukono District
People from Central Region, Uganda